Mycose can refer to

Trehalose, a disaccharide also known as mycose, or mushroom sugar
Mycosis, any disease caused by fungi, called mycose in French